Puerto Bermúdez District is one of eight districts of the province Oxapampa in Peru.

Location of the village is -10.2977, -74.9352, on the Pichis River.

External links
 A Brief Note Regarding Campa Medical Practice

References